Luz Maria Rivas (born February 6, 1974) is an American politician from the state of California. A member of the Democratic Party, she serves in the California State Assembly for California's 39th State Assembly district, which includes San Fernando, Sylmar, and Pacoima.

Rivas is from Los Angeles. She earned a degree in electrical engineering from the Massachusetts Institute of Technology, worked for Motorola, and then earned a Master of Education from the Harvard Graduate School of Education. She founded a non-profit organization based in Pacoima, Los Angeles, to encourage school age girls to pursue careers in science, technology, engineering, and mathematics. She also served on Los Angeles' City Public Works Commission.

Following Raul Bocanegra's resignation from the California Assembly, Rivas declared her candidacy in the special election to succeed him. Rivas won the special election on June 5, 2018, and was sworn into office on June 11.

2018 California State Assembly

2020 California State Assembly

References

External links
Join California - Luz Maria Rivas

Living people
Politicians from Los Angeles
MIT School of Engineering alumni
American electrical engineers
Hispanic and Latino American women in politics
Hispanic and Latino American state legislators in California
Harvard Graduate School of Education alumni
Democratic Party members of the California State Assembly
1974 births
Engineers from California
Women state legislators in California
21st-century American politicians
21st-century American women politicians